are a type of Japanese slippers worn indoors at home, school or certain companies and public buildings where street shoes are prohibited.

Japanese culture mandates that people should remove their shoes when entering homes and other buildings, especially where the floors may have rugs, polished wood floors, or tatami.  are light, flexible shoes which are easy to slip on and off, designated for indoor use. As they are not generally worn outside, the soles are kept clean, and thus cleaning and maintenance of the building's floors are kept to a minimum.

A student's grade level is often indicated by a colored stripe across the toes; the body color of the slipper is always white.

References

External links 

 

Sandals
Japanese footwear
Japanese words and phrases